The Consensus 2005 College Basketball All-American team, as determined by aggregating the results of four major All-American teams.  To earn "consensus" status, a player must win honors from a majority of the following teams: the Associated Press, the USBWA, The Sporting News and the National Association of Basketball Coaches.

2005 Consensus All-America team

Individual All-America teams

AP Honorable Mention:

Academic All-Americans
On March 2, 2005, CoSIDA and ESPN The Magazine announced the 2005 Academic All-America team, with Chris Hill headlining the University Division as the men's college basketball Academic All-American of the Year.  The following is the 2004–05 ESPN The Magazine Academic All-America Men's Basketball Team (University Division) as selected by CoSIDA:

References

NCAA Men's Basketball All-Americans
All-Americans